Capucine Motte (born 1971) is a Belgian-born French woman of letters. A former lawyer (New York and Paris) and gallerist, she won the 2013 edition of the Roger Nimier Prize.

Works 
 La Vraie Vie des jolies filles, Éditions Jean-Claude Lattès, Paris, 2010, 301 p.  - Prix Contrepoint - 2011
 Apollinaria : une passion russe, Éditions Jean-Claude Lattès, Paris, 2013, 296 p.  - Prix Roger Nimier 2013

References 

1971 births
21st-century French novelists
21st-century French women writers
21st-century Belgian novelists
21st-century Belgian women writers
Roger Nimier Prize winners
Living people